The black-lored tit has been split into two species:
 Himalayan black-lored tit, Parus xanthogenys
 Indian black-lored tit, Parus aplonotus

Birds by common name